(stylized as HISTORIĒ) is a Japanese historical manga series written and illustrated by Hitoshi Iwaaki. It has been serialized in Kodansha's seinen manga magazine Monthly Afternoon since 2003, with its chapters collected in 11 tankōbon volumes as of July 2019. It follows the story of Eumenes, a secretary and general to Alexander the Great.

In 2010, Historie received the Grand Prize at the 14th Japan Media Arts Festival as well as the 16th Tezuka Osamu Cultural Prize in 2012.

Plot
Set in the Ancient Greece, in the mid-300s BC, Historie is a fictional account of the life of Eumenes, Alexander the Great's personal secretary and general. The story follows his troublous life, from childhood to adulthood. Growing up in a wealthy family in the city-state of Cardia, Eumenes is framed for the death of his adoptive father and made a slave; Eumenes, eventually, is able to escape and survive. Soon afterwards, he begins a long journey, making a name for himself and gaining recognition in the battlefield due to his knowledge, quick wit and strategic prowess.

Characters
Historie portrays many historical characters who actually existed in ancient Greece and Persia.
 Eumenes
An intelligent young boy from Cardia who has been troubled with a bad dream of a woman killing soldiers since childhood. Much of his past is revealed during the series: he is, in truth, a Scythian, but is adopted by Hieronymus when his own family was massacred in a Greek slave raid. After a relatively happy childhood in Cardia, the events following Scythian slave Thrax's escape resulted in Hieronymus' death and the revelation of Eumenes' Scythian heritage, making him a slave. He was sold and shipped off Cardia, but soon after the slaves on the ship he is in mutinied before being sunk in a storm. Shipwrecked, Eumenes found himself on the shores of Paphlagonia, near the village of Boa, where he spent the rest of his childhood teaching its villagers in the ways of the Greeks, while becoming accepted as one of their own in the meantime. This quiet life was interrupted when a mercenary army from the nearby Greek city of Tios attacked the village. He repelled the attack and killed the leader. He left the village later then went to Cardia, which was under siege by Philip II. He later became Philip's apprentice when he learnt that the former is learning tactics.
 Charon
A slave in the Hieronymus household and Eumenes' personal attendant ("pedagogue" in the original sense of the word). He gives Eumenes an amulet that belongs to Eumenes' mother before the latter leaves Cardia. It is revealed in a flashback that he is, despite his denial to Eumenes, actually present in the incident of Eumenes' mother's death, and is in fact responsible for her downfall by holding young Eumenes hostage. He went to Piraeus, making his fortune as a famous man. 
 Hieronymus (the Elder)
At first appears to be Eumenes' father. However, it is later revealed that he actually adopts him after killing all of Eumenes' native family during a slave raid he led. However, Hironymus himself did not commit this affair, but his subordinates. Considered to be killed by Thrax during the latter's attempted escape, though another person actually appears to be responsible for the crime.
Hieronymus (the Younger)
Hieronymus's son who is jealous of Eumenes in his childhood due to the Eumenes' superior intelligence and skills and his father's apparent favoritism. However, when Eumenes is sold as a slave, it is revealed that most of the information known about Eumenes' life came from Hieronymus, implying that Hieronymus truly cares about Eumenes, deep down.
 Tolmides
A childhood friend of Eumenes. Is seen serving in Cardia's militia when Eumenes returns to the city.
 Satura
Villager of Boa and initially hostile yet curious of Eumenes. As he begins to adapt to life in Boa they grew more and more attached even though it is revealed that she is already betrothed to the next head of the city Tios. After the engagement is broken off due to war she becomes Eumenes lover. However in order to save the village from being destroyed, Eumenes (when found out by the next heir of Tios that he was responsible for the battle) pretends that he was having a personal agenda and did not care about the villagers at all making him an enemy and also giving up Satura to be Telemakos bride to save the lives of the town. She follows along, yet is heartbroken.
 Perialla
A childhood friend of Eumenes who appears to be attracted to him at first. When Eumenes becomes a slave, she treats him with hostility. Later marries a wheelmaker's son.
 Thrax
A Scythian slave. Appears to have recognized Eumenes as a fellow Scythian. During the series, he breaks free and attempts to escape Cardia, killing many of the city's militia and citizens in the process. During a fight in the marketplace, he comes in close contact with Eumenes but does not kill the latter, leading the citizens of Cardia to suspect Eumenes. He is eventually mortally wounded, though apparently died only after attempting to follow Eumenes somewhere. And was used as an excuse by naming him suspect in killing Hieronymus the Elder
 Theogeiton
A loan shark who owns the slave Thrax; known for his brutal treatment of his slaves. When Thrax is released from the shackles that binds his arms and leg, he and his entire family are killed.
 Memnon
A commander of the Greek mercenaries working for the Persians chasing after Aristotle. First seen in Assus, then a part of the Persian Empire while interrogating Hermias, Aristotle's father-in-law, in an attempt to track down the philosopher.
 Hermias
Aristotle's father-in law; a Eunuch. First seen chained up in Assus. Even under intense interrogation, he refuses to say anything about the teacher Aristotle.
 Aristotle
A world-renowned philosopher. At the start of the series, he is being chased by the Persian Empire on suspicion of spying. Along with one of his students, Callisthenes, and the slave Victas, he first meets Eumenes near the ruins of Troy while in need of a boat to cross the Dardanelles. Because Eumenes has not yet finished building his improvised oar, he spend the night camping and conversing with the latter over various subjects, and becomes impressed by the latter's intelligence. The day after that, he, Callisthenes, and Eumenes escapes the Persians in the nick of time, landing in Europe, all headed to Cardia (though Eumenes is left behind).
 Barsine
The wife of the governor of Troius. Is shown to be very intelligent.
 Philip II of Macedon
The king of Macedonia. Introduced in the story claiming to be Antigonus, a merchant from Perinthus, coming to Cardia to look for Hieronymus (the Younger). First meets Eumenes outside the gates of Cardia. Impressed by the latter's performance in gaining entrance to the city, he impetuously asks Eumenes to come and work for him.
 Arrhidaeus
Son of Philip II, shown as an intellectually disabled child. Eumenes gave him a toy chariot, replaced when Alexander the Great accidentally destroyed it.
 Alexander the Great
Son of Philip II of Macedon and Arrhidaeus half-brother. Shown to be a respectful child. Has a split personality named Hephaeston. Shown with a snake-shaped scar, but Hephaeston has none and loathed snakes. He was shown having a calm attitude and an instinctual leader. 
 Olympias 
Alexander the Great's mother. She has a secret agenda for her son. And shown always under the company of men.
 Eurydice
 A relative of Attalus and Eumedes's lover. They broke up when she was engaged to Philip

Publication
Written and illustrated by Hitoshi Iwaaki, Historie has been serialized in Kodansha's seinen manga magazine Monthly Afternoon since 25 January 2003. Kodansha has collected its chapters into individual tankōbon volumes. The first volume was released on 22 October 2004. As of 23 July 2019 eleven volumes have been released.

Volume list

Reception
Historie was a finalist for the 10th installment of Tezuka Osamu Cultural Prize in 2006, and won the Grand Prize at its 16th installment in 2012. The manga was also awarded the Grand Prize for the Manga Division in the 14th Japan Media Arts Festival in 2010.

The Mainichi Shimbun newspaper called Iwaaki's vision of Eumenes' past (which, historically, is largely a mystery) "bold and unique". Manga critic and editor Jason Thompson stated that in terms of scale, ambition, and plotting, Historie is the author's masterpiece.

Notes

References

Further reading

External links
  
 

Epic anime and manga
Historical anime and manga
Kodansha manga
Seinen manga
Winner of Tezuka Osamu Cultural Prize (Grand Prize)